Barbara Snow may refer to:

 Barbara Snow (therapist), American therapist
 Barbara Snow (ornithologist) (1921–2007), English ornithologist and geologist